Chloridoideae is one of the largest subfamilies of grasses, with roughly 150 genera and 1,600 species, mainly found in arid tropical or subtropical grasslands. Within the PACMAD clade, their sister group are the Danthonioideae. The subfamily includes widespread weeds such as Bermuda grass (Cynodon dactylon) or goosegrass (Eleusine indica), but also millet species grown in some tropical regions, namely finger millet (Eleusine coracana) and teff (Eragrostis tef).

With the exception of some species in Ellisochloa and Eleusine indica, most of the subfamily's species use the C4 photosynthetic pathway. The first evolutionary transition from C3 to C4 photosynthesis in the grasses probably occurred in this subfamily, around 32 to 25 million years ago in the Oligocene.

Phylogeny
Relationships of tribes in the Chloridoideae according to a 2017 phylogenetic classification, also showing the Danthonioideae as sister group:

The following genera have not been assigned to a tribe:
Gossweilerochloa
Indopoa
Lepturopetium
Myriostachya
Pogonochloa
Pseudozoysia
Silentvalleya

References

 
Poaceae subfamilies